Timothy A. Tierney (born October 16, 1974) is the Ottawa city councillor of Beacon Hill-Cyrville Ward. He won the ward in the 2010 Ottawa municipal election, defeating the incumbent Michel Bellemare in a narrow contest. In the 2014 Ottawa municipal election Tierney won in a landslide with 82% of the vote.

Tierney has lived in the Beacon Hill North neighbourhood since 1995. Prior to being elected, he served as the president of the Beacon Hill North Community Association, where he played an integral part in keeping Colonel By Secondary School open during the Ottawa East Secondary Accommodation Study in 2008 and 2009.

Tierney's past political involvement included working on the Rainer Bloess Liberal nomination campaign in 2009 in Ottawa-Orleans and many other campaigns including Gerard Kennedy, Paul Martin, and Terry Kilrea.

Tierney is the chair of the Information Technology Sub-Committee and a member of the Transit Commission, Transportation Committee, Ottawa Public Library Board, Ottawa Community Housing, and Pineview Municipal Golf Course Board of Management. He is also a longtime board member of the Gloucester Centre Minor Hockey Association, currently serving as vice president.

In 2012, Tierney was elected to the Federation of Canadian Municipalities board of directors.

On November 23, 2018 Tierney was charged by the Ontario Provincial Police for corrupt election practices for allegedly trying to get a political rival not to run in the 2018 municipal election. The Ottawa Citizen reported, citing sources familiar with the call, that Tierney offered in a phone call to make a donation to the food bank to dissuade election challenger Michael Schurter  from registering to run in Beacon Hill-Cyrville. Tierney has denied any allegations of wrongdoing. As of September 11, 2019, all charges were withdrawn by the Crown after Tierney having apologized in Court and giving up 2 months of Councillor salary.  Michael Schurter reacted by saying: “Last election Tim ran on his reputation and that’s something he may not be able to do again in the future".

References

External links
 

1974 births
Living people
Algonquin College alumni
Ottawa city councillors